Hot Mama is a 2010 Philippine television drama comedy series broadcast by GMA Network. It is the tenth and final installment of SRO Cinemaserye. Starring Eugene Domingo in the title role, it premiered on March 11, 2010. The series concluded on April 8, 2010 with a total of 6 episodes.

Cast and characters

Lead cast
 Eugene Domingo as Lola Cardenas / Hot Mama
 Wendell Ramos as Randy

Supporting cast
 Janna Dominguez as Myrna
 Maureen Larrazabal as Mari
 Victor Aliwalas as Bruce

References

igma.tv SRO Cinemaseye:Hot Mama
Eugene Domingo plays a sex therapist in SROs Hot Mama

External links
 

2010 Philippine television series debuts
2010 Philippine television series endings
Filipino-language television shows
GMA Network drama series
Television shows set in the Philippines